Female entrepreneurs are women who organize and manage an enterprise, especially a business. Female entrepreneurship has steadily increased in the United States during the 20th and 21st century, with female owned businesses increasing at a rate of 5% since 1997.  This increase gave rise to wealthy self-made females such as Coco Chanel, Diane Hendricks, Meg Whitman, and Oprah Winfrey.

History 

The first female-owned business in the United States is recorded in 1739 when Eliza Lucas Pinckney took over her family's plantations in South Carolina when she was 16 years old. In the 18th and 19th centuries, women operated small businesses attained from inheritance or to supplement their income. In many cases, they were trying to avoid poverty or were replacing the income from the loss of a spouse. At that time, the ventures that these women undertook were not thought of as entrepreneurial. Many of them had to focus on their domestic responsibilities. For instance, with longstanding and significant barriers to educational and alternative employment opportunities, Black women were historically relegated to low-paying jobs and domestic work—particularly in the Jim Crow South. As a result, Black women of the early 20th century developed entrepreneurial niches in dressmaking, Black hair care, private home domestic work and midwifery. Lower levels of wealth, access to capital, racial discrimination and inadequate networks have been and continue to be barriers to entrepreneurship women of colour face. 
The term entrepreneur is used to describe individuals who have ideas for products and/or services that they turn into a working business. In earlier times, this term was reserved for men.

Women became more involved in the business world only when the idea of women in business became palatable to the general public; however, this does not mean that there were no female entrepreneurs until that time. In the 17th century, Dutch colonists who came to what is now known as New York City, operated under a matriarchal society. In this society, many women inherited money and lands, and through this inheritance, became business owners. One of the most successful women from this time was Margaret Hardenbrook Philipse, who was a merchant, a shipowner, and was involved in the trading of goods.

During the mid 18th century, it was popular for women to own certain businesses like brothels, alehouses, taverns, and retail shops. Most of these businesses were not perceived with good reputations because it was considered shameful for women to be in these positions. Society frowned upon women involved in such businesses; because they detracted from the women's supposed gentle and frail nature. During the 18th and 19th centuries, more women came out from under the oppression of society's limits, and began to emerge into the public eye. Despite the disapproval of society, women such as Rebecca Lukens flourished. In 1825, Lukens took over the family business, Brandywine Iron Works & Nail Factory, and turned it into a profit-generating steel business.

In the 1900s, due to a more progressive way of thinking, and the rise of feminism, female entrepreneurs began to be a widely accepted term. Although these female entrepreneurs serviced mostly female consumers, they were making great strides. Women gained the right to vote in 1920, and two years later, Clara and Lillian Westropp started the institution of Women's Savings & Loan as a way of teaching women how to be smart with their money. As society progressed, female entrepreneurs became more influential. With the boom of the textile industry and the development of the railroad and telegraph system, women such as Madame C. J. Walker took advantage of the changing times. Walker was able to market her hair care products in a successful way, becoming the first African American female millionaire. Carrie Crawford Smith was the owner of an employment agency that opened in 1918, and like Madame C. J. Walker, sought to provide help to many women by giving them opportunities to work.

During the Great Depression, some of the opportunities afforded to women took a backseat and society seemed to reverse its views, reverting to more traditional roles. This affected women working in business; however, it also served as a push to those involved in the entrepreneurial world. More women began to start their own businesses, looking to survive during this time of hardship. In 1938, Hattie Moseley Austin, who had begun to sell chicken and biscuits after her husband died, opened Hattie's Chicken Shack in Saratoga Springs, New York.

During World War II, many women entered the workforce, filling jobs that men had left behind to serve in the military. Some women, of their own accord, took these jobs as a patriotic duty while others started businesses of their own. One of these women was Pauline Trigere, who came to New York from Paris in 1937, started a tailoring business that later turned into a high-end fashion house. Another woman was Estée Lauder, who was working on the idea for her beauty products which officially launched in 1946, a year after the war ended. When the war ended, many women still had to maintain their place in the business world; because, many of the men who returned were injured.

The National Federation of Business and Professional Women's Clubs were sources of encouragement to female entrepreneurs. They often would hold workshops with already established entrepreneurs, such as Elizabeth Arden, who would give advice. During the 1950s, women found themselves surrounded by messages everywhere, stating what their role should be. Domesticity was the overall public concern and a theme that was highly stressed during this time, and women had to juggle combined home responsibilities and their career.

Home-based businesses helped to solve a good part of the problem for those women who worried about being mothers. Lillian Vernon, while pregnant with her first child, started her own business dealing with catalogues by investing money from wedding gifts and started filling orders right at her kitchen table. Mary Crowley founded Home Decorating and Interiors as a way of helping women to work from home by throwing parties to sell the products right in the comfort of their own home. In an effort to avoid criticism and lost business from those who did not support women in business, Bette Nesmith, who developed the product "Mistake Out," a liquid that painted over mistakes in typing, would sign her orders B. Smith so no one would know she was a female.

From the 1960s to the late 1970s, another change came about when divorce rates rose and many women were forced back into the role of being the sole provider. This pushed them back into the working world, where they were not well received. When the recession hit, many of these women were the first to be without work. Once again, the entrepreneurial endeavours of women came to the rescue as an effort of asserting themselves and aiding other women in being a part of the workforce. Mary Kay Ash and Ruth Fertel of Ruth's Chris Steak House were part of that movement.

The 1980s and 1990s were a time of reaping the benefits from the hard work of women who worked tirelessly for their rightful place in the workforce as employees and entrepreneurs. Martha Stewart and Vera Bradley were among the twenty-first per cent women who owned businesses. The public was also becoming more receptive and encouraging to these female entrepreneurs, acknowledging the valuable contribution they were making to the economy. The National Association of Women Business Owners helped to push Congress to pass the Women's Business Ownership Act in 1988, which would end discrimination in lending and also strike down laws that required married women to acquire their husband's signature for all loans. In addition, the Act also gave women-owned businesses a chance to compete for government contracts.

Another monumental moment for women in business was the appointment of Susan Engeleiter as head of the US government's Small Business Administration in 1989. In the late 1980s and throughout the 1990s, there was more of a focus on networking opportunities in the world of female entrepreneurs. There were many opportunities that came about to help those who were interested in starting up their own businesses. Support groups, organizations for educating the female entrepreneur, and other opportunities like seminars and help with financing came from many different sources, such as the Women's Business Development Center and Count Me In. Despite all these advances, the female entrepreneurs still fell behind when compared to their male counterparts.

As the 1990s came in, the availability of computers and the increasing popularity of the internet gave a much-needed boost to women in business. This technology allowed them to be more prevalent in the business world and showcase their skills to their competitors. Even with the increased popularity of women in business, the availability of technology and the support from different organizations, female entrepreneurs today are still struggling. The economic downturn of 2008 did not serve to help them in their quest. However, with the continual attention given to female entrepreneurs and the educational programs afforded to women who seek to start out with their own business ventures, there is much information and help available. Since 2000, there has been an increase in small and big ventures by women, including one of their biggest obstacles—financing.
 Vartika Manasvi is among those who chose Canada over the US. According to her, "there’s no longevity there."

Demographics 
Studies have shown that successful female entrepreneurs start their businesses as a second or third profession.  Because of their previous careers, female entrepreneurs enter the business world later on in life, around 40–60 years old. According to the Global Entrepreneurship Monitor report, “women are nearly one-third more likely to start businesses out of necessity than men.” Because women are overtaking their male peers in the level of education obtained, having higher education degrees is one of the significant characteristics that many successful female entrepreneurs have in common. The average self-employment rate for women under 25 years old in OECD countries is 7.2%.

The number of self-employed women has steadily increased over the past three decades, putting them at an approximate thirty-three per cent increase. Many female-owned businesses continue to be home-based operations. These types of businesses usually have limited revenue with about eighty per cent of them making less than $50,000 in 2002. This group made up about six per cent of total women-owned businesses. Children of these female entrepreneurs are expected to boost that number as they contribute to the growing number of female entrepreneurs. Most women-owned businesses are in wholesale, retail trade, and manufacturing. Female entrepreneurs have also made a name for themselves in professional, scientific, and technical services, as well as in healthcare and social assistance. In the majority of OECD countries, female entrepreneurs are more likely to work in the services industry than their male counterparts.

In 1972, women-owned businesses accounted for 4.6 per cent of all U.S. businesses—that was about 1.5 million self-employed women. That number increased to 2.1 million in 1979 and 3.5 million in 1984. In 1997, there were about 5.4 million women-owned businesses and in 2007, that number increased to 7.8 million. The participation of females in entrepreneurial activities does of course vary in different levels around the world. For example, in Pakistan, female entrepreneurs account for only 1% of this gender's population, while in Zambia 40% of women are engaged in this activity. The highest number of females involved in entrepreneurial activities can be seen in Sub-Saharan Africa, with 27% of the female population. Latin America/Caribbean economies show comparatively high percentages as well (15%). The lower numbers are seen in the MENA/Mid-Asia region with entrepreneurial activities registering at 4%. Developed Europe and Asia, as well as Israel, also show low rates of 5%.

International implications 
A recent international study found that women from low to middle income countries (such as Russia and the Philippines) are more likely to enter early-stage entrepreneurship when compared to those of higher-income countries (such as Belgium, Sweden, and Australia). A significant factor that may play a role in this disparity can be attributed to the fact that women from low-income countries often seek additional means of income to support themselves and their families. Overall, 40 to 50 per cent of all small businesses are owned by women in developing countries. Alternatively, this may also be because in western business practices, it is not seen as beneficial to exhibit perceived feminine traits. While eastern businesses tend to follow methods based around mutual respect and understanding, western businesses' expectations are for business leaders to be more ruthless, headstrong, and less sensitive or respectful. 

"In the grab for power, women use whatever means available to them, whereas a man would take a club to his opponents head, a woman is more likely use other less forceful and more subversive measures. Let's just own it, we have different weapons in our arsenal." Female entrepreneurs make up approximately 1/3 of all entrepreneurs globally. According to one study, in 2012 there was an approximate 126 million women that were either starting or already running new businesses in various economies all over the world. As far as those who were already established, there was an approximate 98 million. Not only are these women running or starting their own businesses but they are also employing others so that they are participating in the growth of their respective economies.

A study in India, entitled "Barriers of Women Entrepreneurs: A Study in Bangalore Urban District", has concluded that despite all these constraints, successful female entrepreneurs do exist. Female entrepreneurs have evidently more to ‘acquire’ than their male counterparts. But, the socio-cultural environment in which women are born and raised hinders them. Social customs, caste restrictions, cultural restraints, and norms leave women lagging behind men.

Present challenges 
Even though female entrepreneurship and the formation of female-owned business networks is steadily rising, there are a number of challenges and obstacles that female entrepreneurs face. One major challenge for female entrepreneurs faces traditional gender roles that are structurally internalized by society. Entrepreneurship is still considered as a male-dominated field, and it may be difficult to surpass these conventional views. Other than dealing with the dominant stereotype, female entrepreneurs are facing several obstacles related to their businesses.

Human, social, financial capital barriers 
One of the arguments the study of gender discrimination in venture capital funding is that the demand for skilled women entrepreneurs is greater than the supply. In 1999, the Diana Project showed that contrary to conventional wisdom, many of the women who were not financed through growth capital had the necessary skills to build a high-growth business.

Other research has shown that women entrepreneurs are already launching ambitious businesses in the high-technology industry, expanding their social networks, and making their pitches more relatable to the male-dominated VC industry, despite many industry people believing that women are not doing that. Some studies, though, have looked at the social networks of women entrepreneurs, showing that their networks are different from that of their male counterparts and aren't overlapping as much with financial networks. An entrepreneur's social capital is defined by the networks they have access to, and receiving private equity funding is heavily influenced by an entrepreneur's social capital and whether it overlaps with that of venture capitalists. Thus, women continue being disadvantaged in that respect when looking for private equity funding.

Another important factor in receiving private equity funding is an entrepreneur's human capital, derived from education, training and experience. Some studies have shown that women were less likely to have the necessary experience in executive or technical management since they tended to be more present in the retail, finance, service and real estate sectors. This has led other researchers to study female entrepreneurs with extensive human capital, to identify whether they still face discrimination in their funding search. In a study that used data from MIT Venture Mentoring Service, it was found that women with strong human capital were still less likely to pursue their high-growth business ideas full-time. Education, especially in the STEM fields, is another barrier that women face in achieving the necessary human capital.

Obstacles in Supply Specifically in STEM

STEM related fields are heavily populated by men, and women are extremely underrepresented. Many people believe this issue to be getting better, and although it may be, it is still a large issue that must be addressed on a larger scale. From a study done in 2010 by AAUW, it seems as though the underrepresentation stems from societal norms that cause barriers. Some of these barriers include stereotypes and gender bias. But one of the most important aspects that is often not recognized as much is that some of these barriers come from the way that engineering and mathematics programs at universities are geared more towards men. An example outlined in this study was that a woman going into a math exam naturally feels more pressure due to the idea that men are better at math, and the environment of being in a room with more men would subconsciously affect performance as well. In addition, women having the ability to get out of the mindset that they have a fixed amount of intelligence is imperative in achieving more in the scientific world. There are hundreds of peer-reviewed research papers written focusing on many different aspects of education, specifically regarding STEM, that explain the implicit bias against women. For example, a review, “Males under-estimate academic performance of their female peers in undergraduate biology classrooms”, stated that men rank their fellow male classmates as more knowledgeable than their female peers.

There are also issues regarding occupational sex segregation because there is hiring discrimination in the technology and mathematics fields. This is partially due to the way society makes it seem as though it is socially abnormal for women to work in STEM-related fields. In addition, this issue is extremely hard to fix because it is so ingrained in society, but it is important that there are options for girls to get involved in STEM related classes and extracurriculars at a young age in order to create less of an inequality of opportunity. This will also help break the norm that STEM is a man's field.

Gendered processes in finding financing 
A different approach to researching gender discrimination in venture capital funding is studying the gendered processes of looking into financing.

It has been shown that in the venture capital world there is a strong tendency towards homophily, meaning that people with a certain background will associate themselves to individuals with a similar background. This leads to entrepreneurs seeking financing from members of their sex. Their results confirm this hypothesis since only 8.9% of proposals brought to VCs were put forward by women, even though the authors couldn't find a statistically significant difference between the probability for women and men to receive equity. This poses a huge challenge for women entrepreneurs seeking financing from other women, since the number of women venture capitalists has decreased from 10% in 1999 to 6% in 2014, which is why the Diana Project argues that for increasing women-led ventures' access to capital there should be more women VCs.

At the same time, these statistics could also be explained by the higher requirements that women face when submitting a proposal for VC financing. In one study, it was found that financing evaluators see women without a technical background as less capable than males without a technical background. Women with a technical background had an advantage to their male counterparts for being evaluated as more sociable and having better leadership skills. This also meant that for women to be seen as legitimate entrepreneurs they needed to exhibit higher qualifications than male entrepreneurs, needing both a technical background and a higher social capital, thus strong social ties with people from the industry. This shows that for evaluators to trust women entrepreneur's abilities they need to see a greater potential in them than in their male counterparts, likely due to gender stereotypes.

Other studies, though, have shown that these are not the only obstacles women face due to the stereotypes associated to their gender. Multiple studies on discrimination faced by women seeking financing for their ventures have been built on top of the gender role congruity theory, which states that individuals expect men and women to act in ways that match their gender stereotypes. In one study it was observed that qualities associated to successful entrepreneurs converged to attributes that evaluators assigned to male entrepreneurs, while the characteristics opposite to those of an ideal entrepreneur were generally attributed by evaluators to femininity. This highlights the fact that gender stereotyping is consistently being used in venture capitalists' decision making process. Gender stereotyping in the VCs' decision making was also emphasised in a different study that showed that men and women get asked different questions during their pitches. The questions targeted towards the women entrepreneurs are focused on prevention and loss, while their male counterparts receive questions focused on potential gains. While women got asked questions like: "How predictable are your future cash flows?", men were asked: "What major milestones are you targeting for this year?". The authors note that this approach sets up women for failure from the very beginning.

Entrepreneurs are not the only ones affected by gender stereotypes. The whole process of seeking financing, from the relationships between entrepreneurs and investors to the human and social capital, have been shown to have gender embedded in them. It has been shown that women tend to emphasise the human and social capital they have, in an effort to compensate for the lack of resources usually associated with the ideal entrepreneur, especially since other studies have shown that the ideal entrepreneur usually has attributes generally associated to male entrepreneurs.[3]In an effort to emphasise their potential, women also tend to stress the involvement of men as board members and board chairs in their ventures. The authors have classified women entrepreneur's strategies that emphasise more "masculine" attributes of their venture, such as growth ambitions, as compensatory signalling strategies. Another aspect highlighted by this study is that industry experience in "feminine" industries, such as the spa and fitness industry, is seen as less valuable by investors than experience in industries generally associated to masculinity, such as the petrol industry.

Venture capitalist's gendered view of entrepreneur's experience is only one of the examples of having women entrepreneurs held at different standards than their male counterparts. In a study focusing on the financing received by entrepreneurs from banks, it was found that male entrepreneurs received more funding than their female counterparts, despite having the same number of employees and past performance track record (two factors that show viability for a business). Thus, women's strong track records did not correlate as strongly with the funding received as for men, and so for the same business attributes their reward was lower.

Obstacles specific to starting new firms 
The theory of "homophily," is a concept described by social scientists as the tendency for people to seek out or be attracted to those who are similar to themselves. This theory impacts the number of women who are able to start new firms because there are fewer women than men who own their own companies; women compose about half of the labour force but own only 36 per cent of US companies. This statistic shows how it is evident that the number of women in this field is disproportionate to the population. Recent data suggests that when female entrepreneurs start their businesses, they have significantly lower levels of capital than men. A disproportionate access to capital, compared to male entrepreneurs, also serves a systemic barrier to creating a new firm. Women who start their own firms have a higher likelihood of success if they have disposable financial or social capital. Without this opportunity, there are many more obstacles that place women at a disadvantage compared to their male counterparts. Women entrepreneurs are starting with a disadvantage when starting their firms, making it more difficult to navigate the initial stages of growing a personal business. Other obstacles include the fact that firms owned by women tend to be smaller than men, are more likely to fail, and have lower levels of sale, profits and employment. Knowing that these barriers exist may serve as a deterrent to female entrepreneurs, or alternatively increase the chance of less successful firms. Structural elements include sex discrimination and internalized stereotypes that create these barriers. Furthermore, firms owned by women are predominately part of the service and retail sector. Consolidation of female-run firms in a specific sector highlights internalized stereotypes regarding abilities and interests of female entrepreneurs.

External finance and sex discrimination. 
In general, women have lower personal financial assets than men. This means that for a given opportunity and equally capable individual, women must secure additional resources compared to men in order to exploit the opportunity; because they control less capital.  The question of whether women have a harder time getting finance than men for the same business opportunity has developed into its own sub-field. One possible issue in raising outside capital is that 96% of senior venture capitalists are men and may not be as understanding of female-centric businesses. However, the situation seems to be improving. A study by Babson College showed that in 1999, fewer than 5% of venture capital investments went to companies with a woman on the executive team. In 2011, it was 9% and in 2013 it had jumped to 18%.

A specific solution for solving women's difficulties for obtaining financing has been micro-financing. Microfinance is a financial institution that has become exceptionally popular, especially in developing economies. Female entrepreneurs have also been especially successful in getting funded through crowdfunding platforms like Kickstarter.

Due to lack of funding for women in new businesses many women founders have had to hire or create fake male profiles to act as co-founders, executives, or the face of their businesses to make progress.

Obstacles to managing a small firm 

Studies on female entrepreneurs show that women have to cope with stereotypical attitudes towards them on a daily basis. Business relations—from customers to suppliers and banks—constantly remind the entrepreneur that she is different, sometimes in a positive way such as by praising her for being a successful entrepreneur even though she is a woman. Employees tend to mix the perceptions of the manager with their images of female role models, leading to mixed expectations on a female manager to be a manager as well as a "mother". The workload associated with being a small business manager is also not easily combined with taking care of children and a family. However, even if the revenues are somewhat smaller, female entrepreneurs feel more in control and happier with their situation than if they worked as an employee.
Female entrepreneurship has been recognized as an important source of economic growth. Female entrepreneurs create new jobs for themselves and others and also provide society with different solutions to management, organisation, and business problems. However, they still represent a minority of all entrepreneurs. Female entrepreneurs often face gender-based barriers to starting and growing their businesses, like discriminatory property; matrimonial and inheritance laws, and/or cultural practices; lack of access to formal finance mechanisms; limited mobility and access to information and networks, etc.

A woman's entrepreneurship can make a particularly strong contribution to the economic well-being of the family and communities, poverty reduction and women's empowerment, thus contributing to the Millennium Development Goals (MDGs). Thus, governments across the world, as well as various developmental organizations, are actively undertaking the promotion of female entrepreneurs through various schemes, incentives and promotional measures. Female entrepreneurs in the four southern states and Maharashtra account for over 50% of all women-led small-scale industrial units in India.

Obstacles to growing firms 
A specific problem of female entrepreneurs seems to be their inability to achieve growth, especially sales growth. 
Another issue is finance and, as stated previously, the entrepreneurial process is somewhat dependent on initial conditions. In other words, as women often have a difficult time assembling external resources, they start as less ambitious firms that can be financed to a greater degree by their own available resources. This also has consequences for the future growth of the firm. Basically, firms with more resources at start-up have a higher probability to grow than firms with fewer resources. Resources include the following: societal position, human resources, and financial resources. This initial endowment in the firm is of great importance for firm survival and especially for firm growth.

A study by the Kauffman Foundation of 570 high-tech firms started in 2004 showed that women-owned firms were more likely to be organized as sole proprietorships, both during their startup year and in the years to follow. Female entrepreneurs were also much more likely to start their firms out of their homes and were less likely to have employees. This fact may serve as an indication that women either anticipated having smaller firms or were operating under resource constraints that did not allow them to launch firms requiring more assets, employees, or financial resources. This study also found that women only raised 70% of the amount that men raised to start their firms, which ultimately impacted their ability to introduce new products and services or expand their business in terms of employees or geographic locations.

Despite the fact that many female entrepreneurs face growth barriers, they are still able to achieve substantial firm growth. Organizations such as Gritty in Pink - a platform associated with Melissa Etheridge to empower women in music - have succeeded through partnerships with programs like the Long Beach Accelerator, which works with Sunstone Management to invest in tech startups, placing an emphasis on diversity.

Encouragement 

In 1993, "Take Our Daughters To Work Day" was popularized to support career exploration for girls, and later expanded to Take Our Daughters and Sons to Work Day. Hillary Clinton stated that "Investing in women is not only the right thing to do but also the smart thing to do." Research shows that there are many support groups for women in business, for female entrepreneurs, and for women looking for business advice. Women in different areas are willing to show the support that in some cases, they never had. They offer encouragement, advice, and support to moms who seek to provide for their families through their own visions for the business. HerCorner, is a group located in Washington, D.C.  This group seeks to bring women business owners together to collaborate with each other for the betterment of their businesses. There are government-backed programs available to female entrepreneurs and information can be found on their website at SBA Online and their Facebook group SBAgov. Female-only taxi companies in India, the UAE, and Brazil support working women. One example of successful female entrepreneurship in rural villages of Bangladesh is the Infolady Social Entrepreneurship Programme (ISEP). Norway celebrates Female Entrepreneur of the Year.

Reasons for launching firms

Many studies show that women start their own businesses for a variety of reasons. These reasons include the following: having an idea for a business plan, having a passion for solving a specifically related career problem, wanting to be more in control of their careers, maintaining a more balanced life, having a flexible work schedule, and taking a personal vision and turning it into a lucrative business. 
Along with the intense desire to see their vision carried out, these women also have a great ability to multi-task and never feared the risks involved in being self-employed. Women are still facing many issues in the workforce, and being their own boss certainly is more appealing to some of the everyday issues they face outside of entrepreneurship. 
Gender roles are still very much a part of their lives, but some female entrepreneurs, they feel more in control when working for themselves.

Feminism
A feminist entrepreneur is an individual who applies feminist values and approaches through entrepreneurship, with the goal of improving the quality of life and wellbeing of girls and women. Many are doing so by creating ‘for women, by women’ enterprises.’ Feminist entrepreneurs are motivated to enter commercial markets by desire to create wealth and social change, based on the ethics of cooperation, equality, and mutual respect.

See also

 Fortune Most Powerful Women Entrepreneurs
 The Dressmaker of Khair Khana by Gayle Tzemach Lemmon
 Appreneur
 Confederation of Women Entrepreneurs

See also 
Joan Dant

References 

Business occupations
Management occupations
Entrepreneurship

Women and employment